Tosca is a 2001 French drama film directed by Benoît Jacquot based on the 1900 opera by Giacomo Puccini.

Cast 
 Angela Gheorghiu as Floria Tosca
 Roberto Alagna as Mario Cavaradossi
 Ruggero Raimondi as Vitellio Scarpia
 David Cangelosi as Spoletta
 Sorin Coliban as Sciarrone
 Enrico Fissore as Sagrestano

External links 

2001 films
Italian musical drama films
German musical drama films
British musical drama films
French musical drama films
Films directed by Benoît Jacquot
Films based on works by Giuseppe Giacosa
Films based on La Tosca
Films based on operas by Giacomo Puccini
Films set in 1800
Films set in Rome
2000s musical drama films
Opera films
2000s Italian-language films
2000s British films
2000s French films
2000s German films